Turin-Aeritalia Airport also known as Edoardo Agnelli Airport, built in 1916, is the historical airport of Turin in the Piedmont region of northern Italy.

Commercial flights moved to Turin Caselle Airport in 1953 and today Torino-Aeritalia is used for tourist flights and as a flying school, both for gliding and powered flight. There is also a helipad for the use of air ambulances.

One of the airport's buildings was redesigned in 1958 by the Torinese architect Carlo Mollino.

References 

 

Airports in Italy
Transport in Turin
1916 establishments in Italy
Airports established in 1916